The list of ship decommissionings in 1955 includes a chronological list of all ships decommissioned in 1955.


See also 

1955
 Ship decommissionings
Ship